The 1997 Victorian Football League season was the 116th season of the Australian rules football competition. The premiership was won by the Sandringham Football Club, after it defeated Frankston by 29 points in the Grand Final on 21 September.

Premiership season

Ladder

Finals

Grand Final

Awards
The leading goalkicker for the season was Shayne Smith (Springvale), who kicked 107 goals.
The J. J. Liston Trophy was won by Justin Crough (Sandringham).
The Fothergill-Round Medal was won by James Puli (Werribee).
Frankston won the reserves premiership. Frankston 13.15 (93) defeated Port Melbourne 11.7 (73) in the Grand Final, held as a curtain-raiser to the Seniors Grand Final on 21 September.

Notable events
The VFL adopted two rule changes which had been incorporated into the Australian Football League in 1994: the size of the interchange bench was increased from two to three, and the length of a quarter was reduced from 25 minutes to 20 minutes with extra provisions for time on.

See also 
 List of VFA/VFL premiers
 Australian Rules Football
 Victorian Football League
 Australian Football League
 1997 AFL season

References

Victorian Football League seasons
VFL